Nicholas Lloyd Webber (born 2 July 1979) is a Grammy nominated English composer and record producer. He is the son of composer Andrew Lloyd Webber and his first wife, Sarah Hugill.

Lloyd Webber is known for scoring the BBC 1 drama Love, Lies and Records (Rollem Productions), a theatrical and symphonic version of The Little Prince based on the book by Antoine de Saint-Exupéry (co-writing with James D. Reid), which premiered at the Lyric Theatre Belfast and Theatre Calgary before headlining the Abu Dhabi music and arts festival with the Heritage Orchestra, and for the 2017 musical Fat Friends: The Musical, which premiered at the Grand Theatre in Leeds and subsequently toured the UK in 2018. It will be touring the UK again in 2022.

He scored the film The Last Bus (Hurricane Films 2021), directed by Gillies McKinnon and starring Timothy Spall and Phyllis Logan.

He produced the Andrew Lloyd Webber Symphonic Suites at the Theatre Royal Drury Lane in London, to be released by Decca Records in 2021.

He co-produced and mixed the “Cinderella” album for Polydor Records, which went to number 1 in the official UK compilation album charts in July 2021.

He has also written music for television advertisements.

On March 18, 2023, it was announced by his father, Andrew Lloyd Webber that Nick had been hospitalized and is in a critically ill state after fighting gastric cancer for 18 months.

Composer

Feature films

 The Last Bus (Hurricane Films 2021)

Television
 Love, Lies and Records (BBC One, 2017)
Control Z (Netflix 2021 licensed track)
Monarca (Netflix 2020 licensed track)
Grey’s Anatomy (ABC licensed track)
 Wanted: A Family of My Own (ITV 2014)
 56 Up (2012)

Short films 
 Mr Invisible (2013)
 Homecoming (2003) 
 Mon Amour Mon Parapluie (2001)
 Post (1999)

Theatre
 Fat Friends: The Musical (2017)
 The Little Prince (2016)

Personal life
He is the son of British composer Andrew Lloyd Webber and his first wife, Sarah Hugill.  He is the grandson of William Lloyd Webber (1914–1982), who was also a composer.  His uncle is the cellist and music educator Julian Lloyd Webber (born 1951).

He married his partner, viola player Polly Wiltshire, in June 2018.

References

External links
 
 

1979 births
Living people
Lloyd Webber family
English composers
English television composers
English male composers
Sons of life peers